Earthquake in New York is an American television movie that aired on Fox Family Channel on Sunday October 11, 1998 from 8:00 p.m. to 10:00 p.m. ET. The film's tagline was "In a city torn apart, a family comes together". in this film before the ending Los Angeles and New York City were both destroyed by a massive earthquake.

Plot
After an 8.2 earthquake destroys New York City, a detective John searches for his wife Laura and their children Andrew and Carla in the ruins, while also hunting a serial killer.

Cast
 Greg Evigan as Detective John Rykker
 Cynthia Gibb as Laura Rykker
 Melissa Sue Anderson as Dr. Mariyln Blake
 Michael Moriarty as Captain Paul Stenning
 Götz Otto as Detecive Eric Steadman
 Dylan Provencher as Andrew Rykker
 Bryn McAuley as Carla Rykker
 Michael Sarrazin as Dr. Robert Trask

References

External links
 

1998 television films
1998 films
ABC Family original films
Films about earthquakes
Films set in New York City
Films set in Los Angeles
American disaster films
1990s disaster films
Saban Entertainment films
1990s American films